The terms food critic, food writer, and restaurant critic can all be used to describe a writer who analyzes food or restaurants and then publishes the results of their findings.  While these terms are not strictly synonymous they are often used interchangeably, at least in some circumstances.  Those who share their opinions via food columns in newspapers and magazines are known as food columnists. They are often experts in the field.

Terminology
"Food writer" is often used as a broad term that encompasses someone who writes about food and about restaurants. For example, Ruth Reichl is often described as a food writer/editor, who in the course of her career served as the "restaurant critic" for The New York Times and for the Los Angeles Times.  R.W. "Johnny" Apple was also described as a food writer, but never served as a designated restaurant critic. Nonetheless, he wrote frequently about restaurants as he traveled in search of good eats. Calvin Trillin writes a great deal about food (among other things) and has been known to write occasionally about specific restaurants, e.g., Arthur Bryant's and Diedee's. But restaurants figure less prominently in his writing than in Apple's. Finally, Richard Olney was also a noted food writer, but rarely if ever wrote about restaurants.

Food critics and "restaurant critic" are synonyms, in practice, although there is still a distinction to be made. Both suggest a critical, evaluative stance that often involves some kind of rating system. The distinction, if any involves the range of possible investigation. "Food critic" has a more contemporary meaning, suggesting that restaurants, bakeries, food festivals and street vendors are all fair game. Jonathan Gold of L.A. Weekly and the Los Angeles Times, who is the first food critic to win the Pulitzer Prize, exemplifies this trend. "Restaurant critic" is the more traditional title and can connote a more restricted sphere of operations — traditional restaurants, with perhaps those serving French cuisine being the examples. The change in practice, if not in terminology, is often attributed to Reichl's arrival at the New York Times, replacing Bryan Miller. In a series of well-documented incidents, Miller complained that Reichl was "giving SoHo noodle shops 2 and 3 stars" and destroying the rating system that had been built up by Craig Claiborne, Mimi Sheraton, and Miller.

Notable food critics

For most of the past century, the most highly visible food critics have been those who have written for daily newspapers throughout the world and a few who have been restaurant reviewers for influential magazines, such as Gourmet in the United States. The ephemeral nature of radio and television has meant that very few food critics have used this medium effectively (as opposed to chefs who have used all media to great effect). An example is the BBC's The Food Programme. Hugh Fearnley-Whittingstall has also used both broadcast media and print to concentrate on food production rather than presentation, starting a new column in The Guardian in September 2006.

Restaurant critics range in their approach to writing from the acerbic (such as A. A. Gill from London), to the witty/humorous (such as Morgan Murphy, "America's Funniest Food Critic," or Terry Durack from "The Independent on Sunday") to the "been there done that" approach of Ruth Reichl of Gourmet and formerly of The New York Times. Other notable critics include Patricia Wells of the International Herald Tribune, who writes knowledgeable and perceptive articles about food and restaurants and who occasionally uses the sword rather than her usual suave style. Another was R. W. Apple, Jr., from The New York Times, who wrote long, thoughtful articles about his travels throughout the world in search of great food. Brad A. Johnson in Los Angeles is the only American restaurant critic to win both the coveted James Beard Award and the Le Cordon Bleu World Food Media Award for restaurant criticism. The record for the most meals eaten by a food critic is 46,000 by Fred E. Magel of Chicago, in 60 countries over a 50-year career.

Then there are myriad regional food critics, ranging from Nancy Leson in Seattle, to Pat Nourse in Sydney, Cooper Adams in Albany, and Stephen Downes and John Lethlean in Melbourne, who pen weekly and monthly reviews of the best of their respective cities.

Giles Coren was very known to his show, "Million Dollar Critic" who assesses the restaurants in Canada & United States where he focuses on quality of services, food taste & the ambiance of each and every restaurant that he visited. Aside from his hosting project, he is also a food columnist for The London Times, GQ, Tatler & The Independent UK to tell about his reviews of restaurants around the world, especially in United Kingdom.

Food criticism on the internet
The internet has slowly become more important in forming opinions about restaurants. Food criticism on the Internet has allowed creation of shows with specific audiences.

See also

 Culinary arts
 Food grading
 Food libel laws
 Food writing
 Gastronomy
 Gourmet ideal
 List of James Beard Award winners for Best Restaurant Review or Critique
 Restaurant rating

References

External links
 Anonymous Restaurant Critic

 
Criticism
Journalism occupations